Joseph Martray (born 14 May 1914, Lamballe – died 2 June 2009, at Rennes) was a French jurist, journalist, and politician. He was a member of the Legion of Honour of France. He supported Breton rights.

1914 births
2009 deaths
People from Lamballe
Breton nationalists
French Resistance members
French jurists
Recipients of the Legion of Honour